TiK is an open source instant messaging client for the AOL Instant Messenger (AIM) system, which uses AOL's TOC protocol. It is a GUI client which is written in the Tcl/Tk programming language. Reportedly, the "T" and the "K" in TiK's name stands for "Tk", and the "i" stands for "instant messenger".

It was originally created and maintained by AOL, the first releases seemed to occur in the 1998 time frame, but roughly around 1999 AOL abandoned the project after producing version 0.75, the last AOL produced version. Following this, several independent developers continued to add new features to the client, however work has stalled and the client is currently unmaintained, the last version released was version 0.90.

External links
 Independent TiK development website
 Tik 0.75 (Last AOL Version)

AIM (software) clients
Free software programmed in Tcl
Software that uses Tk (software)